The 1947 Isle of Man Tourist Trophy was the first race festival since 1939 due to the interruption of World War II. With the restart of racing, the ACU decided to add three Clubman-class races for production machines in Lightweight, Junior and Senior categories, making the festival a six-race event. It held in 9-13 June. 

Speeds were somewhat lower than the pre-war races due to the low quality "pool" petrol available, and it would be another three years before Daniell's 1938 lap record was broken. Superchargers were banned for motorcycle racing from 1946, so that may have reduced speed too.

This was an early race appearance for the E90 AJS Porcupine, ridden to ninth in the Senior by Les Graham.

Senior TT (500cc)

Junior TT (350cc)

Lightweight TT (250cc)

Clubmans Senior TT

Clubmans Junior TT

Clubmans Lightweight TT

Notes
 Major road widening occurred on the Snaefell mountain course at the 33rd Milestone, including the removal of fence posts at road level.

Sources

External links
1947 Isle of Man race results

Isle of Man TT
1947
1947 in British motorsport